Edward Beach Llewellyn (January 11, 1879 in St. Louis, Missouri – September 25, 1936 in Monahans, Texas) was an American trumpeter, cornetist, and composer.

Early life 
Llewellyn was the son of a trumpeter, coronetist and composer. In 1890, Edward began to study the cornet with his father. He also studied piano, violin, and harmony at Chicago Music College. In 1893, father and son played in the orchestra of the Chicago World's Columbian Exposition.

Career 
Llewellyn played in the Chicago Marine Band from 1895 to 1899, later becoming solo trumpet in the band from 1900 to 1904. He played, again with his father, at the Pan-American Exposition in 1901.

After the turn of the century, Llewellyn played cornet and trumpet with Brooke's Band on Catalina Island. On August 26, 1903 Llewellyn caught a record sea bass at Santa Catalina Island. It weighed 425 pounds.

Llewellyn was also a gifted sportsman, wrestler and golfer. In 1907 and 1908 he was the U.S. national champion cyclist. Llewelyn was the principal trumpet player with the Chicago Symphony for 22 years. At the time of his accidental death in Texas, he was personnel manager of the Chicago Symphony.

Career 
Edward Llewellyn was the son of Welsh-born trumpeter James D. Llewellyn (1843–1920), who emigrated to the United States in 1855. James had been a featured cornet soloist at the 1893 World's Fair.

 1895-1899: Trumpet and Coronet with the Brookes Chicago Marine Band 
 1900-1904: Trumpet soloist with the Brookes Chicago Marine Band
 1905–1906: Cornet soloist with the United States Marine Band
 1907–1908: Principal trumpet of the Pittsburg Symphony
 1908–1912: Principal trumpet with the Rochester Municipal Band (Minnesota) 
 1909–1911: Principal trumpet of the Chicago Opera
 1911–1933: Principal trumpet of the Chicago Symphony
 1916–1923: Principal trumpet of the Ravinia Park Opera Company
 1933–1936: Personnel manager of the Chicago Symphony

Soloist appearances 
 1907: Soloist with the British Guards Band at the Manhattan Beach Hotel at Coney Island

Affiliated engagements 
Llewellyn was affiliated with the Frank Holton Company and worked part-time as a salesman for the Chicago branch of the company, where it is said he sold a remarkable number of instruments for the amount of time that he spent doing so.

Selected compositions 
He composed many solos including "My Regards," which he wrote for his own use while with the Chicago Symphony.

Students 
Among Llewellyn's many students were Clifford P. Lillya, late professor of cornet and trumpet at the University of Michigan, and Llewellyn's successor in the Chicago Symphony, trumpet manufacturer Renold Schilke. After Llewellyn's death, Schilke copied the Mouthpiece Edward used and is part of the Schilke Mouthpiece catalog as the model 9

Athletic activities 
Edward Llewellyn was also a noted cyclist, winning national championships in 1907 and 1908. He was also a wrestler, boxer, and passionate golfer.

 August 1897: Winner of the 1/3 mile, League of American Wheelmen Annual Amateur Championship, Philadelphia
 July 30, 1898: Amateur Record, 1 mile

He also was an avid fisherman. In 1903 he caught what was then the world record Sea Bass which weighed in at 425.  Picture.

Death 
Llewellyn was killed in a car accident in Monahans, Texas, in 1936 when a pipe fell off a truck he was following and crashed through the windshield.

References

American trumpeters
American male trumpeters
1936 deaths
American cornetists
American people of Welsh descent
American male cyclists
1879 births